Events from the year 1982 in Denmark.

Incumbents
 Monarch - Margrethe II
 Prime minister - Anker Jørgensen (until September 10, Poul Schlüter

Events
 January 5 – 17 years old Curt Hansen wins the European Junior Chess Championship
 January 8 – A Danish cold record is set when a temperature of -31.2 is registered in Hørsted, a village in the Thy region of northern Jytland.
 September 10 – Poul Schlüter becomes prime minister

Undated

Sports

Badminton
 28 March  Morten Frost wins gols in men's single at the 1982 All England Open Badminton Championships.
 13–18 April — With 2 gold medals and five bronze medals, Denmark finishes as the second best nation at the 8th European Badminton Championships in Böblingen, West Germany.
 Gentofte BK wins Europe Cup.

Cycling
 René Pijnen (NED) and Patrick Sercu (BEL) win the Six Days of Copenhagen sox-day track cycling race.

Births
 2 March – Pilou Asbæk, actor
 15 April – Henriette Engel Hansen, sprint canoeist
 14 May – Anders Eggert, handball player

Deaths
 12 January – Emil Hass Christensen, actor (b. 1903)
 16 January – Harald Agersnap, composer, educator and musician (b. 1899)
 24 April – Sigrid Horne-Rasmussen, actress (b. 1915)
 1 June – Einar Juhl, film actor (born 1896)
 15 June – Erling Foss, engineer and businessman (b. 1897)
 21 December  – Frants Hvass, diplomat (born 1896)

See also
1982 in Danish television

References

 
Years of the 20th century in Denmark
1980s in Denmark